Debate with Mare at Pare is a Philippine television public affairs debate show broadcast by GMA Network. Hosted by Oscar Orbos and Solita Monsod, it premiered on November 18, 1998. The show concluded on November 2, 2006. It was replaced by Palaban in its timeslot.

Hosts 

 Oscar "Pareng Oca" Orbos
 Solita "Mareng Winnie" Monsod

Accolades

References

External links
 

1998 Philippine television series debuts
2006 Philippine television series endings
Debate television series
Filipino-language television shows
GMA Network original programming
GMA Integrated News and Public Affairs shows
Philippine television talk shows